JACC: Cardiovascular Intervention is a peer-reviewed sub-specialty medical journal published by Elsevier for the American College of Cardiology since 2008. The journal focus on articles on interventional cardiology, encompassing cardiac coronary and non-coronary interventions, including peripheral arteries and cerebrovasculature (e.g., carotid artery). The majority of articles report results from clinical trials illustrating evidence to inform and alter practice guidelines and experimental studies describing improved technologies and understanding of cardiac disease. The journal has a 5-Year Impact Factor of 9.605 (2018), is part of the American College of Cardiology journal family, and is ranked among the top 10 cardiology journals.

Abstracting and indexing 
The journal is indexed by Medline, PubMed, and scopus.

Associated journals
Associated journals are the following:
 Journal of the American College of Cardiology
 JACC: Cardiovascular Imaging

See also
 European Heart Journal
 Circulatory system

References

External links 
 

Cardiology journals
Elsevier academic journals
English-language journals
Publications established in 2008
Academic journals associated with learned and professional societies of the United States